Jacques Chausson (c. 1618 – 29 December 1661) was a French ex-customs manager and writer. He was arrested on 16 August 1661 and charged with attempted rape of a young nobleman, Octave des Valons. He was convicted of sodomy and sentenced to death. His tongue was cut out and he was burned at the stake (without being suffocated first, the more common and "merciful" practice).

Legal proceedings
"This Friday, twenty-ninth day of the month of August, is judged before us one dressed in a cinnamon-colored garment, he who declared to us that he was coming in order to obey our ruling of yesterday, he whom we had questioned and interrogated in the manner and fashion that follow: Asked his name, he answered that he is Octave des Valons, Equestrian, son of Germain des Valons, Equestrian, lord of Duchesne; and of the late Louise Angelique du Vesnien, his wife. Asked his age, he answered that he turned seventeen years old the eighteenth day of this past March.

"Asked the subject of the dispute he had had on Tuesday the twelfth of last August, with the named Jacques Chausson and Jacques Paulmier, in a third-floor apartment in a house on rue Saint Antoine, near the old rue du Temple, occupied by the same Chausson, he answered that, having known Chausson, and having been led to his home by a young man named le Sueur, he had finally gone August twelfth. Paulmier said to Chausson while speaking of Octave des Valons, 'There is a pretty blond!' to which Chausson replied 'I believe he is a pretty enough boy to offer us his services.' When des Valons retorted that he wished to be appropriate to the task, Chausson made a statement, and said that the service they were asking of him would cost him nothing, and that the same Paulmier was for his part obliged to treat him the same way when he wanted. Des Valons having had the misfortune to realize that he had not asked to have carried out for him the wish that he was obliged to grant Paulmier, Chausson advanced, and while embracing him undid the button of his pants at the same time, and then Paulmier began knowing him carnally, and committing with him the crime of sodomy. Having felt this, he began to shout and struggle, and then an old woman, working that day at the home of Mr. Petit, merchant and head of the house, came running."

Poems about his fate

Popular ditties
Si l'on brûlait tous ceux
qui font comme eux
dans bien peu de temps hélas
plusieurs seigneurs de France
grands prélats d'importance
souffriraient le trépas.

Savez-vous l'orage qui s'élève
contre tous les gens de bien?
Si Chausson perd son procès en Greve,
le cu ne servira plus de rien.
Si Chausson perd son procès en Greve,
le con gagnera le sien.

Je suis ce pauvre garçon
nommé Chausson
si l'on m'a rôti
a la fleur de mon âge
c'est pour l'amour d'un page
du prince de Conti.

Si le bougre D'Assouci.
eût été pris
il aurait été rôti
tout au travers des flammes
comme ces deux infâmes
de Chausson et de Fabri.

If they burned all those
who do as they do
In short order, alas,
Several lords of the realm
and great men of the cloth
Would pay with their heads.

Do you know the storm that is rising
against all good people?
If Chausson loses his trial in Greve,
The ass will serve no purpose
If Chausson loses his trial in Greve,
The cunny will win his own.

I am this poor boy
named Chausson
If they roasted me
at the flower of my age
It is for the love of a page
of the prince of Conti.

If that fellow d'Assouci
had been taken
He would have been roasted
Surrounded by flames
Like these two scoundrels
de Chausson and de Fabri.

By Claude Le Petit (1638–1662)
French poet, burned at the stake for "atheism," but in particular for having written the poem below.
Amis, on a brûlé le malheureux Chausson...
1661

Amis, on a brûlé le malheureux Chausson,
ce coquin si fameux, à la tête frisée;
sa vertu par sa mort s'est immortalisée:
jamais on n'expira de plus noble façon.

Il chanta d'un air gai la lugubre chanson 
et vêtit sans pâlir la chemise empesée, 
et du bûcher ardent de la pile embrasée, 
il regarda la mort sans crainte et sans frisson.

En vain son confesseur lui prêchait dans la flamme,
le crucifix en main, de songer à son âme;
couché sous le poteau, quand le feu l'eut vaincu,

l'infâme vers le ciel tourna sa croupe immonde,
et, pour mourir enfin comme il avait vécu,
il montra, le vilain, son cul à tout le monde.

Friends, they have burned the unfortunate Chausson,
This famous rascal with the curly hair;
His virtue is by his death immortalized:
Never will one expire in a more noble fashion.

He sang in a gay air the lugubrious song
and wore without paling the starched shirt
and from the eager chopping to the lit pile
He watched death without fear and without a shiver.

In vain, his confessor preached to him in the flame,
crucifix in hand, of thinking about his soul;
Seated under the post, when the fire had vanquished him,

The scoundrel turned toward the sky his filthy rump,
and, finally to die as he had lived,
He showed, the villain, his ass to everyone.

See also 

 List of people executed for homosexual activity

References 

1618 births
1661 deaths
Executed French people
17th-century French criminals
French rapists
French gay writers
17th-century executions by France
People executed by France by burning
People executed for sodomy
17th-century LGBT people
Violence against men in Europe